The Scout and Guide movement in Malawi is served by the following organisations
 The Malawi Girl Guides Association, member of the World Association of Girl Guides and Girl Scouts
 The Scout Association of Malawi, member of the World Organization of the Scout Movement

See also